Mission Canyon is a census-designated place and an unincorporated suburb of Santa Barbara, California, in Santa Barbara County, United States. The population was 2,381 at the 2010 census, down from 2,610 at the 2000 census.

Mission Canyon is directly north — on the mountain side — of the city of Santa Barbara, and derives its name from the Mission Santa Barbara which is built between Mission Canyon and the center of the city.  The canyon itself is one of the most dramatic in the Santa Ynez Mountains with the locally highest peak, La Cumbre Peak  at the top of the watershed, flanked by Cathedral Peak  and Arlington Peak  to the west, Pine Lookout and Rock Garden to the east, and rugged sandstone formations partially covered with chaparral on both sides of the creek.

State Route 192 (Foothill Road) bisects the southern portion of the area, running from east to west, and Mission Canyon Road passes through the area from north to south.  Another major north-south artery is Tunnel Road, which leads to the trailhead for several popular hiking trails that originates from an area of medium density and semi-rural development at the canyon's northern extremity, and extends into Los Padres National Forest in the Santa Ynez Mountains.

The Santa Barbara Botanic Garden is located in Mission Canyon.

Geography

The approximate center of Mission Canyon is located at  (34.449797, -119.716315). Situated along the southern facing slopes of the Santa Ynez Mountains, Mission Canyon measures some 1,122 acres comprising an estimated 1,141 parcels primarily consisting of single-family residential development, recreational, open space, and agricultural land uses; but however lacks any commercial or industrial development. Non residential features include the Santa Barbara Botanic Garden, Rocky Nook County Park, the Santa Barbara Woman's Club, and the Santa Barbara County Fire Department Fire Station 15.

Climate
This region experiences warm (but not hot) and dry summers, with no average monthly temperatures above 71.6 °F.  According to the Köppen Climate Classification system, Mission Canyon has a warm-summer Mediterranean climate, abbreviated "Csb" on climate maps.

Demographics

2010
The 2010 United States Census reported that Mission Canyon had a population of 2,381. The racial makeup of Mission Canyon was 2,193 (92.1%) White, 14 (0.6%) African American, 17 (0.7%) Native American, 40 (1.7%) Asian, 11 (0.5%) Pacific Islander, 35 (1.5%) from other races, and 71 (3.0%) from two or more races. Hispanic or Latino of any race were 198 persons (8.3%).

The Census reported that 2,372 people (99.6% of the population) lived in households, 0 (0%) lived in non-institutionalized group quarters, and 9 (0.4%) were institutionalized.

There were 1,020 households, out of which 230 (22.5%) had children under the age of 18 living in them, 547 (53.6%) were opposite-sex married couples living together, 59 (5.8%) had a female householder with no husband present, 20 (2.0%) had a male householder with no wife present.  There were 59 (5.8%) unmarried opposite-sex partnerships, and 14 (1.4%) same-sex married couples or partnerships. 264 households (25.9%) were made up of individuals, and 97 (9.5%) had someone living alone who was 65 years of age or older. The average household size was 2.33.  There were 626 families (61.4% of all households); the average family size was 2.70.

The population was spread out, with 368 people (15.5%) under the age of 18, 100 people (4.2%) aged 18 to 24, 458 people (19.2%) aged 25 to 44, 973 people (40.9%) aged 45 to 64, and 482 people (20.2%) who were 65 years of age or older.  The median age was 51.3 years. For every 100 females, there were 95.5 males.  For every 100 females age 18 and over, there were 97.0 males.

The homeowner vacancy rate was 0.8%; the rental vacancy rate was 4.4%.  1,828 people (76.8% of the population) lived in owner-occupied housing units and 544 people (22.8%) lived in rental housing units.

2000
As of the census of 2000, there were 2,610 people, 1,065 households, and 689 families residing in the CDP. The racial makeup of the CDP was 93.64% White, 0.42% African American, 0.15% Native American, 1.30% Asian, 0.04% Pacific Islander, 2.18% from other races, and 2.26% from two or more races. Hispanic or Latino of any race were 6.63% of the population.

There were 1,065 households, out of which 23.5% had children under the age of 18 living with them, 52.6% were married couples living together, 8.1% had a female householder with no husband present, and 35.3% were non-families. 22.3% of all households were made up of individuals, and 6.1% had someone living alone who was 65 years of age or older.  The average household size was 2.44 and the average family size was 2.73.

In the CDP the population was spread out, with 16.9% under the age of 18, 5.0% from 18 to 24, 27.8% from 25 to 44, 35.4% from 45 to 64, and 14.9% who were 65 years of age or older.  The median age was 45 years. For every 100 females, there were 93.2 males.  For every 100 females age 18 and over, there were 93.4 males.

The median income for a household in the CDP was $79,338, and the median income for a family was $103,442. Males had a median income of $57,222 versus $41,131 for females. The per capita income for the CDP was $43,422.  About 1.0% of families and 6.8% of the population were below the poverty line, including 1.6% of those under age 18 and 7.4% of those age 65 or over.

References

Census-designated places in Santa Barbara County, California
Santa Barbara, California
Santa Ynez Mountains